Dhaka Central International Medical College is a private medical school in Mohammadpur Thana of Dhaka, Bangladesh, established in 2011. The college is affiliated with University of Dhaka as a constituent college.

Academics
The college offers a five-year course of study, approved by the Bangladesh Medical and Dental Council (BMDC), leading to a Bachelor of Medicine, Bachelor of Surgery (MBBS) degree from Dhaka University. After passing the final professional examination, there is a compulsory one-year internship. The internship is a prerequisite for obtaining registration from the BMDC to practice medicine.

References

2010 establishments in Bangladesh
Educational institutions established in 2010
Universities and colleges in Dhaka